Stephan Karl Knoll (born 1982) is an Australian politician who represented the South Australian House of Assembly electorate of Schubert for the South Australian Division of the Liberal Party of Australia from the 2014 state election until the 2022 election. Knoll served as the Minister for Transport, Infrastructure and Local Government and as the Minister for Planning in the Marshall Ministry between 22 March 2018 and 26 July 2020 and as the Leader of Government Business in the South Australian House of Assembly between 5 February 2020 and 26 July 2020.

Background and early career
Knoll attended Christian Brothers College, Adelaide, and University of Adelaide, completing a Bachelor of Commerce (Marketing).

Prior to entering State Parliament he was the general manager of his family's small business Barossa Fine Foods.

He is a former State President of the South Australian Young Liberal Movement.

Parliamentary career
After his election in 2014, Knoll was appointed to the Parliamentary Committee on Occupational Safety, Rehabilitation and Compensation. In January 2016, Knoll released a booklet entitled "40 Reasons Why You Can't Trust Labor with Your Money". Also in January, Knoll was promoted to Shadow Parliamentary Secretary for Waste, Deregulation, and IT use in government. In February 2016, Knoll was appointed to the Parliament's Economic and Finance Committee.

In January 2017, fourteen months before the 2018 state election, Knoll was promoted to the shadow cabinet, taking on the portfolios of Police, Emergency Services, Corrections and Road Safety.

Following the March 2018 election, he was appointed as the Minister for Transport, Infrastructure and Local Government and Minister for Planning. On 5 February 2020, Knoll was appointed as Leader of Government Business in the House.

Knoll secured a record $1.1 billion for regional road projects and infrastructure upgrades across the state in the 2019-20 State Budget. This was the single biggest injection of new funding in a state budget for regional roads in South Australia's history.

Knoll advocated and secured the construction of twin tunnels to complete the North-South Corridor as part of the 2020 State Budget, citing this as one of his achievements as minister - alongside local government and planning reform - when announcing his retirement from politics in December 2020.

During his tenure as Planning Minister, Knoll navigated the rolling implementation of broader system changes including the introduction of a statewide electronic planning system - the first of its kind in Australia. Phase 1 of the Planning and Design Code was rolled out in Outback SA on 1 July 2019, with Phase 2 (Rural) introduced on 31 July 2020 and Phase 3 (Urban) on 19 March 2021.

In June 2020, Knoll introduced the Local Government Reform Bill in Parliament. Key elements in the Bill were rate capping, the establishment of behavioural standards for councillors and reductions of red tape to improve efficiency and lessen the burden on councils. The Bill was passed in June 2021, with the omission of rate capping.

In July 2020, as part of a broader investigation into a number of country MPs, Knoll was investigated by the Independent Commissioner Against Corruption (ICAC) into the possible misuse of the Country Members Accommodation Allowance. Knoll resigned from cabinet on 26 July 2020. On 15 October 2020, the ICAC announced that there would be no further inquiry or investigation relating to some of the members of parliament, including Knoll.

The Urban Renewal Authority, trading as Renewal SA, was within his portfolio responsibilities until 28 July 2020, when it was moved to that of the Treasurer, Rob Lucas.

On 1 December 2020, Knoll announced that he did not intend to contest the 2022 election.

References

External links 

Members of the South Australian House of Assembly
Living people
21st-century Australian politicians
University of Adelaide alumni
1982 births